β-Naphthoflavone, also known as 5,6-benzoflavone, is a potent agonist of the aryl hydrocarbon receptor and as such is an inducer of such detoxification enzymes as cytochromes P450 (CYPs) and uridine 5'-diphospho-glucuronosyltransferases (UGTs). β-Naphthoflavone is a putative chemopreventive agent.

See also
 alpha-Naphthoflavone
Aryl hydrocarbon receptor

References

Flavonoids
Benzochromenes